Kosmos 580 ( meaning Cosmos 580), known before launch as DS-P1-Yu No.59, was a Soviet satellite which was launched in 1973 as part of the Dnepropetrovsk Sputnik programme. It was a  spacecraft, which was built by the Yuzhnoye Design Bureau, and was used as a radar calibration target for anti-ballistic missile tests.

Launch 
Kosmos 580 was successfully launched into low Earth orbit at 11:24:55 UTC on 22 August 1973. The launch took place from Site 133/1 at the Plesetsk Cosmodrome, and used a Kosmos-2I 63SM carrier rocket.

Orbit 
Upon reaching orbit, the satellite was assigned its Kosmos designation, and received the International Designator 1973-057A. The North American Aerospace Defense Command assigned it the catalogue number 06793.

Kosmos 580 was the sixty-fourth of seventy nine DS-P1-Yu satellites to be launched, and the fifty-eighth of seventy two to successfully reach orbit. It remained in orbit until it decayed and reentered the atmosphere on 1 April 1974.

See also 

 1973 in spaceflight

References 

1973 in spaceflight
Kosmos satellites
Spacecraft launched in 1973
Dnepropetrovsk Sputnik program